Annibal is a play by French playwright Pierre de Marivaux. 

Plays by Pierre de Marivaux
Cultural depictions of Hannibal
Plays set in the 2nd century BC